The Battle of Santander was a battle fought in the War in the North campaign of the Spanish Civil War during the summer of 1937. Santander's fall on 26 August assured the Nationalist conquest of the province of Santander, now Cantabria. The battle devastated the Republic's "Army of the North"; 60,000 soldiers were captured by the Nationalists.

Background
After the fall of Bilbao on 19 June and the end of the failed Republican offensive at Brunete on 25 July, the Nationalists decided to continue their offensive in the North and occupied the Cantabria Province.

Opposing forces
The Nationalists' Army of the North had 90,000 men (of which, 25,000 Italian), led by general Davila. The Italian force, led by General Bastico, comprised Bergonzoli's Littorio Division, Frusci's Black Flames Division and Francischi's 23 March Division. The Nationalists had also six Navarrese brigades led by Colonel Solchaga, two Castilian brigades led by General Ferrer, and one mixed Hispano-Italian division, the Black Arrows, led by Colonel Piazzioni. The Nationalists had also 220 modern aircraft on this front (70 of the Condor Legion, 80 of the Aviazione Legionaria and 70 Spanish), including many Bf 109 fighters.

Opposing them, the Republicans had Prada's 14th Army Corps and José García Vayas's 15th Army Corps, under the overall command of General Mariano Gámir Ulíbarri; a total of about 80,000 men. The Republicans had also 44 aircraft (mostly slow and old, except 18 Soviet-built fighters). Furthermore, the morale of the Republican troops was low, and Basque soldiers thought that they might surrender to the Italians, in return for their lives.

Timeline
 14 August The Nationalist 1st Navarrese Brigade attacks the front between Valdecebollas (Palencia) and Cuesta Labra, trying to cut off the Republican forces south of the Cantabrian Mountains.
 15 August The Nationalists advance in the area of Barruelo (Palencia) up to Peña Rubia, Salcedillo, Matalejos and Reinosilla; the Republic's fight back at Portillo de Suano.
 16 August The Nationalists overcome the Republicans at Portillo de Suano and take the factories near Reinosa (Cantabria); they enter Reinosa itself at nightfall. The 4th Navarrese Brigade advances at the River Saja valley towards Cabuérniga Valley (Cantabria). Italian forces advance from Burgos to Lanchares and San Miguel de Aguayo (Cantabria).
 17 August Italian forces take El Escudo Pass and join the rest of the forces at San Miguel de Aguayo. 22 Republican battalions are encircled at Campoo (Cantabria).
 18 August Nationalist forces take Santiurde, and Italian forces take San Pedro del Romeral and San Miguel de Luena (Cantabria).
 19 August Nationalist forces advance in Cabuérniga and the Pas River valley, taking Bárcena de Pie de Concha and Entrambasmestas (Cantabria).
 20 August Italian forces advance towards Villacarriedo and Navarrese forces advance towards Torrelavega and Cabezón de la Sal.
 22 August The Nationalist take Selaya, Villacarriedo, Ontaneda and Las Fraguas (Cantabria).
 23 August Navarrese forces enter Mazcuerras Valley and take Mount Ibio, nearly cutting the main road and railway between Santander and Asturias. Italian forces face Republican resistance near Puente Viesgo (Cantabria).
 24 August General Gámir-Ulibarri orders the general evacuation towards Asturias. The Nationalist take Torrelavega and Barreda, cutting the main road to Asturias. The Basque forces, after defeating the front, sign the Santoña Agreement (Spanish Pacto de Santoña) by which they surrender to the Italians.
 25 August The main Republican authorities leave Santander, heading to Gijón (Asturias).
 26 August Nationalist forces enter Santander around noon; 17,000 republicans are made prisoners, many of whom would be immediately executed.
 1 September The Nationalists take Unquera (Cantabria), in the limit with Asturias.
 17 September Tresviso, the last Cantabrian territory in Republican hands, falls to the rebels.

Consequences
Santander's fall, coupled with the capture of heavily fortified Bilbao, tore an irreparable gap in the Republic's northern front. The destruction of the Army of the North marked another crippling blow to the Republic's sagging strength and turned the war to Franco's favour. Factors accounting for the Republican defeat include:

The Nationalists' overwhelming superiority in artillery and air power.
A lack of unified command among Asturian, Cantabrian, and Basque Republican units.
The precision, shock, and rapidity of the Nationalist advance, which had as its objective the destruction of enemy forces and not the consolidation of territory.
The defenders' poor morale, in contrast to the exceptional confidence and enthusiasm of the Nationalists.
Mutinies and sedition by the Basque units in the Republican camp (Santoña Agreement).

The disaster proved total and the losses beyond repair. Of the twelve Basque brigades there remained at the end only eight battered battalions. The Republican Army of Santander of twelve brigades was reduced to six battalions. The Asturians committed 27 battalions and escaped with only fourteen. In no other theatre of the civil war did Franco's troops achieve results as decisive as those of the Santander campaign: sixty thousand Republican soldiers were wiped off the map, with corresponding losses in materiel. The War in the North was all but won.

See also 

 List of Spanish Nationalist military equipment of the Spanish Civil War
 List of weapons of the Corpo Truppe Volontarie
 Condor Legion
 List of Spanish Republican military equipment of the Spanish Civil War

Notes

References
VV.AA.; Gran Enciclopedia de Cantabria. Editorial Cantabria SA. Santander. 1985 (8 volumes) and 2002 (volumes IX, X y XI)

External links
 La Guerra Civil en Cantabria
  Puerto del Escudo and Italian Forces

Battle of Santander
Santander
Santander
Santander
August 1937 events
September 1937 events